Jorge Armando McFarlane Olazábal (born 20 February 1988 in Lima) is a Peruvian athlete competing in the 110 metres hurdles and long jump events. His younger brother, Javier McFarlane, is also an athlete.

Personal bests
Outdoor
 110m hurdles – 13.52 (wind: 0.0 m/s) (Cali, Colombia, 26 June 2016)
 Long jump – 8.10 m  (wind: +0.7 m/s) (Sucre, Bolivia, 23 November 2009)
Triple jump – 15.13 m (wind: +0.1 m/s) (São Paulo, Brazil, 8 July 2007)

Indoor
 60m hurdles – 7.98 (Santiago, Chile, 23 February 2010)

Competition record

References

External links

1988 births
Living people
Sportspeople from Lima
Peruvian male hurdlers
Peruvian male long jumpers
Athletes (track and field) at the 2007 Pan American Games
Athletes (track and field) at the 2011 Pan American Games
Athletes (track and field) at the 2015 Pan American Games
Pan American Games competitors for Peru
World Athletics Championships athletes for Peru
South American Games gold medalists for Peru
South American Games bronze medalists for Peru
South American Games medalists in athletics
Competitors at the 2014 South American Games
Athletes (track and field) at the 2018 South American Games